Lucius ( Loukios) is a male given name derived from Lucius (abbreviated L.), one of the small group of common Latin forenames (praenomina) found in the culture of ancient Rome. Lucius derives from Latin word Lux (gen. lucis), meaning "light" (<PIE *leuk- "brightness", Latin verb lucere "to shine"), and is a cognate of the name Lucas. Another etymology proposed is a derivation from Etruscan Lauchum (or Lauchme) meaning "king", which however was transferred into Latin as Lucumo. Lucy is the feminine derivative of the name.

In addition, Lucius is a British masculine given name and an Austrian,  German, Luxembourgish and Dutch surname. Lucius has been translated into Italian, Spanish and Portuguese, as Lucio. Derived from the related patronymic Lucianus is Luciano in Italian, Spanish and Portuguese, Lucien in French and Luken in Basque.

Given name
Lucius of Alexandria, Patriarch of Alexandria
Lucius of Britain, a 2nd century Christian king
Lucius of Chur, legendary first bishop of Chur
Lucius of Cyrene, Roman church founder
Lucius (consul 413), Roman politician
Lucius Allen (born 1947), American basketball player
Lucius Aurelius Marcianus, 3rd century Roman general
Lucius Caecilius Metellus Denter, Roman consul and praetor
Lucius Postumius Megellus (consul 262 BC), Roman general and politician
Lucius Manlius Vulso Longus, Roman patrician and consul
Lucius Caecilius Metellus (consul 251 BC), Roman consul, pontifex maximus and dictator
Lucius Pinarius, Roman governor
Lucius Beebe (1902–1966), American writer
Lucius Borich (born 1971), Australian musician
Lucius Caesar (17 BC–AD 2), Roman soldier
Lucius Cary (disambiguation)
Lucius D. Clay (1897–1978), American general
Lucius Cornelius Sulla Felix (138 BC–78 BC), Roman consul and dictator
Lucius Cornelius Scipio Asiaticus (228 BC-183 BC), Roman general and statesman
Lucius Curtis (1786–1869), British admiral
Lucius Davis (born 1970), American basketball player 
Lucius Domitius Aurelianus (215-275), Roman Emperor
Lucius Jacques Dupré (1822–1869), American politician
Lucius Elmer (1793–1883), American politician
Lucius Fairchild (1831–1896), American politician and general
Lucius Ferraris (died 1763) Italian Franciscan canonist
Lucius Gwynn (1873–1902), Irish cricketer
Lucius Henderson (1861–1947), American film director
Lucius Kelly (1858–1932), Canadian politician
Lucius Littauer (1859–1944), American politician
Lucius Lyon (1800–1851), American politician
Lucius Nieman (1857–1935), American journalist
Lucius O'Brien (1731–1795), Irish politician
Lucius Trant O'Shea (1858-1920), British chemist and mining engineer
Lucius Quinctius Cincinnatus (520 BC–430 BC), Roman aristocrat
Lucius Quintus Cincinnatus Lamar (I) (1797–1834), American lawyer
Lucius Quintus Cincinnatus Lamar (II) (1825–1893), American politician and judge
Lucius Junius Polk (1802–1870), American politician
Lucius Robinson (1810–1891), American lawyer and politician
Lucius Shepard (1943–2014), American writer
Lucius Tarquinius Priscus, legendary king of Rome from 616 BC to 579 BC
Lucius Tarquinius Superbus, seventh king of Rome from 535–509 BC
Lucius Verus (130–169), Roman emperor
Pope Lucius I (200–254)
Pope Lucius II (died 1145)
Pope Lucius III (1100–1185)

Fiction
Lucius, fictional character in the Apuleius novel The Golden Ass
Lucius Tiberius, a fictional Roman Emperor in Arthurian Literature.
Lucius, fictional character in the play Julius Caesar by William Shakespeare
Lucius, fictional character in the play Titus Andronicus by William Shakespeare
Lucius, fictional character, played by Mike Epps, in the 2003 film The Fighting Temptations
Lucius, fictional character in the PlayStation 3 game, Trinity Universe
Lucius, fictional character, played by Michael Clarke Duncan, in the 2006 film Talladega Nights: The Ballad of Ricky Bobby
Lucius, fictional character, played by Ron Randell, in the 1961 film King of Kings
Lucius Best, fictional character in the 2004 film The Incredibles 
Lucius Brockway, fictional character in the Ralph Ellison novel Invisible Man
Lucius Down, fictional character in the Jeff Smith comic Bone
Lucius Faversham, fictional character in the radio comedy The Penny Dreadfuls Present...
Lucius Fox, fictional character in the Batman comic books and movies
Lucius Hunt, fictional character in the 2004 film The Village by M. Night Shyamalan
Lucius Lavin, fictional character in the television series Stargate Atlantis
Lucius Malfoy, fictional character in J.K. Rowling's Harry Potter series
Lucius Petrus Dextrus, fictional character in the television series Doctor Who 
Lucius Provine, fictional character in the William Faulkner short story A Bear Hunt
Lucius Quick, fictional character in the William Faulkner novel The Reivers
Lucius the Eternal, fictional character in the Warhammer 40,000 universe
Lucius Vorenus, fictional character in the television series Rome
Lucius Wagner, fictional character in the video game Lucius 
Lucious Lyon, fictional character in Empire (2015 TV series)
Lucius, fictional character in Fire Emblem: The Blazing Blade
Lucius, fictional character in the movie Gladiator (2000 film)

Surname

Hanibal Lucić (1485–1553), Croatian poet and playwright
Johannes Lucius (1604–1679), Venetian Dalmatian historian
Theo Lucius (born 1976), Dutch football player

See also
 Lucius (praenomen)
 Saint Lucius (disambiguation)
 Lucious, given name
 Luscious (disambiguation)

References 

English-language masculine given names
Latin masculine given names
Latin-language surnames
Patronymic surnames
Masculine given names
Surnames